In theoretical computer science, in particular in automated reasoning about formal equations, reduction orderings are used to prevent endless loops. Rewrite orders, and, in turn, rewrite relations, are generalizations of this concept that have turned out to be useful in theoretical investigations.

Motivation
Intuitively, a reduction order R relates two formal expressions s and t if t is properly "simpler" than s in some sense.

For example, simplification of terms may be a part of a computer algebra program, and may be using the rule set { x+0 → x , 0+x → x , x*0 → 0, 0*x → 0, x*1 → x , 1*x → x }. In order to prove impossibility of endless loops when simplifying a term, the reduction order defined by "sRt if expression t is properly shorter than expression s" can be used;  applying any rule from the set will always properly shorten the term.

In contrast, to establish termination of "distributing-out" using the rule x*(y+z) → x*y+x*z, a more elaborate reduction order will be needed, since this rule may blow up the term size due to duplication of x. The theory of rewrite orders aims at helping to provide an appropriate order in such cases.

Formal definitions
Formally,
a binary relation (→) on the set of terms is called a rewrite relation if it is closed under contextual embedding and under instantiation; formally: if l→r implies u[lσ]p→u[rσ]p for all terms  l, r, u, each path p of u, and each substitution σ. If (→) is also irreflexive and transitive, then it is called a rewrite ordering, or rewrite preorder. If the latter (→) is moreover well-founded, it is called a reduction ordering, or a reduction preorder.
Given a binary relation R, its rewrite closure is the smallest rewrite relation containing R. A transitive and reflexive rewrite relation that contains the subterm ordering is called a simplification ordering.

Properties

 The converse, the symmetric closure, the reflexive closure, and the transitive closure of a rewrite relation is again a rewrite relation, as are the union and the intersection of two rewrite relations.
 The converse of a rewrite order is again a rewrite order.
 While rewrite orders exist that are total on the set of ground terms ("ground-total" for short), no rewrite order can be total on the set of all terms.
 A term rewriting system  is terminating if its rules are a subset of a reduction ordering.
 Conversely, for every terminating term rewriting system, the transitive closure of (::=) is a reduction ordering, which needn't be extendable to a ground-total one, however. For example, the ground term rewriting system { f(a)::=f(b), g(b)::=g(a) } is terminating, but can be shown so using a reduction ordering only if the constants a and b are incomparable.
 A ground-total and well-founded rewrite ordering necessarily contains the proper subterm relation on ground terms.
 Conversely, a rewrite ordering that contains the subterm relation is necessarily well-founded, when the set of function symbols is finite.
 A finite term rewriting system  is terminating if its rules are subset of the strict part of a simplification ordering.

Notes

References

Rewriting systems
Order theory